Göran Unger (29 September 1899 – 6 April 1982) was a Swedish athlete. He competed in the men's pentathlon at the 1924 Summer Olympics.

References

External links
 

1899 births
1982 deaths
Athletes (track and field) at the 1924 Summer Olympics
Swedish pentathletes
Olympic athletes of Sweden
People from Bollnäs
Sportspeople from Gävleborg County